Marché Adonis is a supermarket chain operating in the Canadian provinces of Quebec and Ontario. The company is based in Montreal, Quebec. In 2011, Metro Inc. acquired a majority stake (55.5%) (CAD$153.8 million) in Marché Adonis.

History 

Adonis was founded in 1979 by Lebanese brothers Elie and Jamil Cheaib, and their friend Georges Ghorayeb, who provided the funding. Inspired by their roots in the Eastern Mediterranean and the idea of bringing their culture to a new world, the Cheaib brothers and their friend Georges Ghorayeb developed the idea of trading typical food of the Middle East in North America.

In 1979, they opened their small  store on Faillon Street, at the corner of Lajeunesse Street, in Montreal.

Expansion
In 1984, the need to expand their original store and increase the size of the company quickly became synonymous with success and the fact that Montreal's Arabic-speaking and Mediterranean communities had become very large. To better serve customers, the team had to focus on a more strategic location that serviced larger areas of the community, which led to the opening on l'Acadie Boulevard.

Then two much bigger stores were launched in 2003, one on Sauvé Street (replacing the store on l'Acadie Boulevard) and another in Montreal's West Island on des Sources Boulevard in Roxboro.

These were followed by further stores at Place Vertu in Ville Saint-Laurent, on Saint Catherine Street in Downtown Montreal, on Peel Street in Griffintown and Boulevard des Roseraies in Anjou in East Montreal.

Marché Adonis also expanded to Laval in the North Shore with two branches on Boulevard Curé-Labelle, Laval and avenue des Aristocrates in East Laval and also to the South Shore with a store on Boulevard Leduc in Brossard. A branch was opened in the Gatineau region, replacing the Target in that city.

On October 26, 2011, Elie Cheaib, Jamil Cheaib and Georges Ghrayeb signed an agreement with Metro Inc. which acquired a majority stake of 55%.

In 2013, Adonis opened their first store in Ontario, Canada, located in Mississauga, followed by another one in Scarborough. A second Mississauga location as well as a new location in Ottawa opened in 2019.

See also 
 Metro Inc.
 List of supermarkets in Canada

References

External links 
 

Supermarkets of Canada
Companies based in Montreal
Retail companies established in 1979
1979 establishments in Quebec
Metro Inc.
Middle Eastern-Canadian culture in Quebec